A referendum on the hours for the sale of liquor in hotel bars was held in New Zealand on 23 September 1967. Voters were asked whether they favoured continuing the closing of hotel bars at 6 pm or later closing, the actual hours of sale to be decided according to local conditions. The change was favoured by 64.5% of voters.

This referendum voted to abolish six o’clock closing of hotel bars and the six o’clock swill. The Sale of Liquor referendum, 1949 had voted to continue six o’clock closing, which had been introduced in 1917.

The referendum was held in conjunction with the 1967 New Zealand parliamentary term referendum. Bar closing times were extended to 10 p.m. on 9 October 1967, three weeks after the referendum.

Results

References

1967 referendums
Licensing hours referendum
Referendums in New Zealand
Prohibition referendums
Alcohol law in New Zealand